José Antonio Martín Domínguez (born 4 April 1964) is a Spanish former footballer who played as a left midfielder.

Club career
Born in Sant Joan Despí, Barcelona, Catalonia, Domínguez was a product of FC Barcelona's youth system, but only appeared once for the first team, good enough for a 1985 championship medal. For four years he was mainly registered with the third side and the reserves, scoring 15 Segunda División goals in 1987–88 for the latter, a record that was only surpassed nearly 30 years later by Jonathan Soriano. Ahead of the following season, he signed with neighbours UE Figueres of the same league.

After only one year, Domínguez returned immediately to La Liga, joining CA Osasuna. In his first three seasons, he experienced a fourth place in 1990–91, a third-round run in the subsequent edition of the UEFA Cup and 104 league games. However, he featured sparingly in his last two years, and the Navarrese were also relegated at the end of the 1993–94 campaign.

Domínguez retired at the age of 35 after two seasons with CA Marbella and three with lowly CF Gavà, the former club in the second tier.

International career
Domínguez appeared in three 1991 friendlies with Spain, against Portugal (his debut, on 16 January), Hungary and Romania.

Honours
Barcelona
La Liga: 1984–85

References

External links

1964 births
Living people
People from Sant Joan Despí
Sportspeople from the Province of Barcelona
Spanish footballers
Footballers from Catalonia
Association football midfielders
La Liga players
Segunda División players
Segunda División B players
FC Barcelona C players
FC Barcelona Atlètic players
FC Barcelona players
UE Figueres footballers
CA Osasuna players
CA Marbella footballers
CF Gavà players
Spain international footballers